This is a list of engineering blunders, i.e., gross errors or mistakes resulting from grave lack of proper consideration, such as stupidity, confusion, carelessness, or culpable ignorance,  which resulted in notable incidents.

Fort Montgomery was sometimes referred to as "Fort Blunder", because the first version of the U.S. Army fort was inadvertently built on the Canadian side of Lake Champlain.
 The NASA Mars Climate Orbiter, launched in 1998, burned up in the Martian atmosphere. A mixup between metric and US Standard measurements in the controlling software caused the spacecraft to miss its intended 140–150 km altitude above Mars during orbit insertion, instead entering the Martian atmosphere at about 57 km.
 The NASA Genesis mission was an attempt to sample particles from the solar wind. It successfully collected a sample and returned to Earth. However at the last moment the landing parachute failed to open and the return capsule smashed into the ground at high speed, contaminating the samples. The parachute failure was traced to an accelerometer installed backwards.
 Quebec Bridge collapses
 Tacoma Narrows Bridge (1940)
 Deepwater Horizon oil spill caused by a faulty blowout preventer.

See also
List of disasters for aircraft/rail/shipwreck disasters
Catastrophic failure Structural failures
Space accidents and incidents

External links
Drunk photons and the myth of the electromagnetic vorticity

References

Lists of events
Science-related lists
Error